The D.T. Watson Home for Crippled Children is famous as one of the first sites in the world to test the Jonas Salk vaccine for polio in 1954.  The home is located in the Pittsburgh suburb of Leet Township near Sewickley, in the U.S. state of Pennsylvania.

External links 
 The Watson Institute and Home for Crippled Children

Buildings and structures in Allegheny County, Pennsylvania
Hospitals in Pennsylvania